Bal Raksha Bharat, commonly known as Save the Children India, is a non-profit organization working to improve the lives of marginalized children in India since 2008. Headquarter is in Gurugram, and registered as Bal Raksha Bharat in India (under Societies Registration Act, 1861), the organization is a member of the international Save the Children Alliance.

While Save the Children has been working in India since the 1940s, Save the Children India formally came into being as Bal Raksha Bharat in April 2008. Since then it has reached 10.1 million children. The organization implements sustainable, community-driven projects across India from remote locations to urban areas. The goal of these projects is to provide children with quality education and healthcare, protection from harm and abuse, and life-saving aid during emergencies.

Bal Raksha Bharat also works through Advocacy and Campaigning, liaising with government stakeholders and civil society in support of children’s rights.

History
As World War, I drew to an end in 1919, Eglantyne Jebb launched a movement named Save the Children Fund to cater to the needs of children whose lives were affected by the war. She was driven by the belief that all children have the right to a healthy, happy, and fulfilling life. Three years later in 1922, she drafted a document named ‘Declaration of the Rights of the Child’. The declaration contained a number of proclamations intended to provide and safeguard certain universal rights for children. It was this declaration that would become the axis around which the United Nations Convention on the Rights of the Child (UNCRC) would revolve.

In 1924, the League of Nations, the precursor to the United Nations adopted Jebb’s declaration. What started as an emergency relief fund went on to become a major worldwide movement for protecting the rights of children. The first connection between Save the Children and India was made when Mahatma Gandhi signed Jebb’s declaration in 1931.

In the early 1940s, when World War II broke out, Save the Children provided relief and rehabilitation to the affected children. Hundreds of thousands of children received relief in the form of clothing and shoes. More than 800,000 books were distributed in schools. In India, a child welfare centre in Kolkata was supported and this marked the entry of the organization in India. After the war ended, Save the Children began work with displaced children, refugees and concentration camp survivors in the devastated areas of France, Yugoslavia, Greece, Austria, and Poland.

In the 1950s and 1960s, Save the Children worked extensively in Asia. Children affected by the Korean War were provided essential relief.  
In 2004, when a devastating Tsunami struck the South-East coast of India, Save the Children provided a rapid relief response that continued for several months. Four years later, in April 2008, Save the Children started functioning as an independent Indian member of the Save the Children International Alliance under the name Bal Raksha Bharat.

Campaigns

#EveryLastChild
In 2016, Save the Children launched a global campaign to reach out to the most excluded and forgotten children in the world through advocacy, fundraising and program work 

(1). The defined objectives for the campaign were: a fair chance for all children should be there, all children should be treated equally and there should be accountability which can be great to children.

Bal Raksha Bharat reached around 700,000 children as a part of this campaign.

#TheInvisibles
Through #TheInvisibles campaign, Bal Raksha Bharat sought to address the most vital issues of children living in street situations 

(2). The organization believes that these are perhaps the most deprived children in India, who are all around us yet “invisibles”, that is their issues and needs are often ignored. Through this campaign, the organization worked to address the biggest problem these children face – lack of identity. This was done by the means of providing them an Aadhaar Card and linking them to various government programs.

#Vote4Children
This is another hallmark campaign of the organization which has been rolled out twice: in the run to 2014 and 2019 General Elections in India  

(3). Through the campaign, Save the Children prepared a Children’s Manifesto which is a Charter of Demands children have from their political representatives. This manifesto was presented by children in Save the Children’s intervention areas to MPs, MLAs and politicians of various constituencies. An online petition encouraging people to support the campaign was also floated.

In 2019, the organization entered its 100th year globally. Bal Raksha Bharat will focus on mobilizing commitments, partners, and resources for seven “Big Ideas” and contribute towards India’s progress for achieving the Sustainable Development Goals 2030.

The seven Big Ideas are:  
 Pneumonia: The Forgotten Killer
 Undernutrition: A Silent Emergency
 Children are Ready for School
 Ending Violence Against Children
 Rights for Children in Street Situations
 Resilient and Climate-Smart Children
 Triple Dividend of Investing in Adolescents

Awards and recognition
NGO Felicitation and Wish Realization Award 2016 by ZEE TV: Save the Children was selected as the ‘Best NGO working on Child Rights in Rajasthan’ for the prestigious Zee TV’s ‘NGO Felicitation and Wish Realization Awards 2016’. The organization was selected out of 250 NGOs working on children’s issues in Rajasthan through an impact review and nominations.

Campaigns
 #TheInvisibles campaign for Street Children was shortlisted among 60 best campaigns in South Asia for Social Media For Empowerment Awards
 #KidsNotForSale campaign on Child Trafficking was shortlisted for the Best Viral Marketing Campaign at India Digital Awards and for New York Advertising Awards

Awards to Child Champions 
12 Child Champions of Save the Children selected as Ashoka Youth Venturers. 
Save the Children’s Child Chfn for Sustainable Development Goals 2030 and went on to attend the United Nations General Assembly meeting in September 2018 in New York. She was also awarded the Savitri Bai Phule Award by the Government of India.
Youth Champion Shalini from Odisha was awarded the UN Volunteer award as part of Youth Affairs and Sports Ministry's initiative. She will also be attending the Women Deliver 2019 Conference in Canada in June 2019.
Youth Advocate from West Bengal, Anoyara Khatun was conferred the prestigious Nari Shakti Award by the President of India.

See also
 Save the Children
 Save the Children International
 Save the Children USA
 Save the Children State of the World's Mothers report
 Declaration of the Rights of the Child
 Convention on the Rights of the Child

References

External links
 

Non-profit organisations based in India